Sports Racer may refer to:
Sports car racing, a form of circuit auto racing
Sports Racer Series, an Australian motor racing series